Braddon (/ˈbræd-ənˈ/) Mendelson is an American producer, director, and playwright.  He produced the 1998 cult classic film  "Boogie Boy," which was directed by Craig Hamann and executive produced by Academy Award winner Roger Avary, both of whom were collaborators on Quentin Tarantino's first film "My Best Friend's Birthday."  

He is the author of five full-length plays, including "Rembrandt Perfected" -- winner of the 2022 Long Beach Playhouse New Works Festival.

As a music video producer, Mendelson worked with some of the top R&B and Rap artists of the late 1990s, including Xzibit, Outkast, Bizzy Bone, Mo Thugs and Ice Cube. As a consequence of producing Outkast's 1998 music video for their song "Rosa Parks," Mendelson in 2005 was added as a defendant to the Rosa Parks v. LaFace Records lawsuit, but was subsequently dismissed from the case by the presiding judge. 

Mendelson co-created the video poetry series, "CineVerses" with poet/composer Jerry Danielsen. In 2010, he wrote and illustrated the children's book "Have You Seen the Tickle Bug?" and is the director and on-camera host for the children's YouTube show, "Read Me a Story with Brad Mendelson." He also publishes the award-winning satirical website TheSkunk.org.

Mendelson is also a progressive political activist, who was elected as a delegate to the California Democratic Party in 2013 and 2015.

Published works 
 Mendelson, Braddon (2010). Have You Seen the Tickle Bug?, Cuckoo Concertos, 40 pages. 
 Mendelson, Braddon,  & Goodbody, J.B. (editor), et al. (2012). Net's Best Satire, Vol 1 [Kindle Edition], News Roast, LLC, 175 pages. ASIN: B007T7PO6W

References

External links 
 
 
 Have You Seen the Tickle Bug?
 The Skunk: "Tasteless America Satire for the Ill-Informed"
 CineVerses: Poetry That Moves
 Boogie Boy Blu-ray

Living people
Film producers from California
1961 births